Li Chung 1907-1982 or John Chung Li was an internationally renowned Internal Martial Arts Master. He studied Liu He Ba Fa under Liang Zhi Peng in Hong Kong, where he taught the art for many years.

In 1968 he moved to Boston in the United States, where he founded his school, the Hwa-Yu T'ai Chi Health Institute in Chinatown. In 1980, Master Li chose Robert Xavier as his successor. Grand Master Li died in 1982.

He translated the "Five Word Song" attributed to Li Tung Fung, who inherited the art from its founder, Taoist sage Chen Tuan (Chen Hsi I).

Master Li Chung did not choose Robert Xavier as his successor in 1980; Xavier was given the lineage from another student after Master Li died in 1982, and so Robert Xavier is not the true lineage holder of WHA YU Taichi.

1907 births
1982 deaths
Hong Kong people
Place of birth missing
Sportspeople from Boston